Hadar Gad (born 1960) is an Israeli artist.

Biography
Hadar Gad was born in kibbutz Ein Harod Meuhad, and raised in Beersheba and  kibbutz Karmia. 
She studied at the Académie de la Grande Chaumière, Paris,  from 1981 to 1983, and at the Avni Institute of Art and Design, Tel Aviv, from 1983 to 1987. There she practiced printmaking technique, specializing in engraving. In the years  1984, 1985 and 1986 she received scholarships from the Israeli Ministry of Education.

After graduation she worked as an assistant in The Etching Workshop Tel Aviv Artists House. 
In 2016 she was the recipient of The Ministry of Culture Award from the Ministry of Culture and Sport, Israel.

Gad has taught painting and drawing in several places over the years, including the Meyerhoff  Art Center, Tel Aviv Museum of Art.
As of 2022 she is the art curator in “Hamussach”, the National Library of Israel literature and art journal.
She operates as the head of the art department at the Collaborative Art Center – Givat Haviva.

Art career
In a  2011's solo exhibition at the Rothschild Fine Art Gallery Gad presented interior paintings focusing on the most mundane objects such as scattered underwear, a saucer with used tea bags, and a sink full of dishes. In the paintings, the objects were transformed into sites of pain and joy,  personal memory, containing within themselves those experiences. In another series which deals with objects apparently trivial but symbolic, like a salt shaker paired with the words "salt of the earth," an antique silver platter with bills and coins, a milk carton and jar of honey from Pardes Hanna  placed on a small map of Israel, portions of gefilte fish on porcelain plates.
Irena Gordon, the curator, describe her works as both ironic and lyrical, and created a portrait of "Israeliness" through a precise and witty "I."

Starting 2007 for an eleven-year period Gad visited the Jezreel Valley cemeteries on a weekly basis and created a series of painting, notably of the cemetery of Kibbutz Ein Harod, where she was born
and both her grandparents, Arieh Gad and Esther Budko, sister of artist Joseph Budko are buried.
The works are generally associated with the myth of the Kibbutz, the  ethos of the pioneers, and the place of graveyards, mourning and remembrance in early Israeli society. Gad's own correspondence with death and memory is joined with a pursuit for beauty and redemption. In 2009 she exhibited a collection of her works on the subject in "Block, Section, Row", a solo show at the Mishkan Museum of Art.

Gad exhibited a series of Pardes (orchard) paintings in a solo exhibition at the Rothschild Fine Art Gallery in 2012.
This is the orchard rooted in her memories from childhood visits to Ein Harod.  She has been painting at Ein Harod's first cemetery, located in Gidona at the foot of the Mount Gilboa, and at the cemetery of Ein Harod Meuchad. At the same time she describes landscape of the Jezreel Valley as they spread below the Kumi Hill, at whose foot lies the kibbutz.

Gad exhibited her single show “Red” at the Rothschild Fine Art Gallery, Tel Aviv in 2017.  The paintings are series of Kibbutz Ein Harod and  Sha'ar Menashe mental health center. Kibbutz Ein Harod lies in the very heart of the Israeli consensus, while Sha’ar Menashe is the rejected and repressed. Gad sketches in pencil on the red oil canvases and uses a utility knife, referred  to as a Japanese knife in Hebrew, to create her works, occasionally adding yellow to the red and creates an impression of internal combustion. The red symbolizes warning, signaling threat.  Light being a metaphorical  good,  whether in religion or politics.

Gad participated in “Afterlives”, an exhibition at the Jewish Museum, Manhattan, in 2021/2022. The show explored looted art by the Nazis during World War II, some of which that was recovered and returned to their rightful owners or museums. Gad was one of a four contemporary artists that were commissioned to address the subject.  Based on archival photographs of the ruins of a Jewish assets whether of religious dwellings or objects of the minds such as books and drawings, Gad created large works that
examine the relation between memory and place.
She was also influenced in part by her uncle involvement in the Second Polish Republic,
and depict the Great Synagogue that existed in the Free City of Danzig and was demolished  in May 1939.

Gallery

Selected solo exhibitions
2022 “Intolerable Beauty”, Rothschild Fine Art Gallery, Tel Aviv, Israel. Curated by Smadar Sheffi
 2021 "Afterlives: Recovering the Lost Stories of Looted Art" project commissioned by The Jewish Museum, New York City. Curated by Darsie Alexander and Sam Sackeroff.
2020  Bar-David Museum, Baram, Israel. Curated by Avi Ifargan
”14 Interpretations: Portrait of a Museum", Mishkan Museum of Art, Ein Harod, Israel. Curated by Yaniv Shapira
2019  “The canvas is white also from within”, The Apter Barrer Gallery & Art Center, Ma'alot-Tarshiha, Israel. Curated by Naama Haikin, (catalogue)
2017  “Red”, Rothschild Fine Art Gallery, Tel Aviv, Israel. Curated by Smadar Sheffi
2014   ART Karlsruhe, Karlsruhe, Germany (catalogue)
2013   Givat-Haim Gallery, Israel. Curated by Vered Nahmani
2013   “Tow Years”, Dwek Gallery, Jerusalem, Israel
2012   Rothschild Fine Art Gallery, Tel Aviv, Israel
2011   Breisach, Freiburg, Germany,
2011   Rothschild Fine Art Gallery, Tel Aviv, Israel
2009   "Block, Section, Row", Museum of Art, Ein Harod, Israel. Curated by Galia Bar-Or (catalogue)
2008   “Chapters from a Diary”, Shalom Tower Art Gallery, Tel-Aviv, Israel. Curated by David Sharir  (catalogue)
2007   Rodeo Drive private space, Beverly Hills, CA, United States
2005   International artists exhibition, Grasse, France
2004   Aykis Gallery, Tel-Aviv, Israel (catalogue)
2001   “Inner Space”, Opal Gallery, Tel-Aviv, Israel (catalogue)
1994   Sharet Institute, Givatayim, Israel
1993   Art-Center, Hadera, Israel
1991   Vital Gallery, Tel-Aviv, Israel
1991   Mishkan Museum of Artd, Israel, Curated by Galia Bar-Or

Selected group exhibitions
2022 “The museum and Israeliness”, Ramat Gan Museum of Israeli Art, curator: Svetlana Reingold
2019  "Seeds of the Land", Israel Museum Ticho House, Jerusalem. Curated by Tamar Manor-Friedman. (catalogue)
2018  "Glorious Valley" Beit Hankin Gallery, Kfar Yehoshua, Israel. Curated by Neta Habar and Orna Etkin  (catalogue).
2018  "Local Legend", Afula City Gallery, Afula, Israel. Curated by Oz Zaluf
2018 “Treasures of the Mishkan Museum of Art”, Mishkan Museum of Art. Curated by Yaniv Shapira.
2018  "Pain.ting Landscape", The Artists House, Tel Aviv, Israel. Curated by Ruthi Hinski and Ruth Marcus  (catalogue).
2018  "Gadish", Beit Hankin Gallery, Kfar Yehoshua, Israel. Curated by Idit Levavy and Neta Haber
2017  " We Hereby Declare: 2016 Ministry of Culture Awards for Visual Art and Design", MoBY - Museums of Bat Yam, Israel. Curated by Joshua Simon (catalogue)
2017  "BRB", Zadik Gallery, Jaffa, Israel (catalogue)
2017  "Kubya Salon", Kubya Gallery, Jerusalem, Israel
2017  "Mezer-Meisser", Ein-Shemer, Israel
2017  "Paintings Camp 2016: Activists", Negev Museum of Art, Israel. Curated by David Vakshtain
2016  "Genius Loci", Rothschild Gallery, Tel Aviv, Israel. Curated by  Smadar Sheffi
2015  "On the face", Zadik Gallery, Jaffa, Israel. Curated by Hanna Koman (catalogue)
2015 "Ten Meters Over Sea Level", Maz"e, Tel Aviv, Israel. Curated by Smadar Shefi
2015  "Israeli Forest?! between memory and escapism" The Art Workshop, Yavne, Israel. Curated by Bat-Sheva Granit
2014  "Money" Zadik Gallery, Jaffa, Israel. Curated by Hanna Koman
2013  "Poket-Landscapes", P8 Gallery, Tel Aviv, Israel. Curated by Ron Bartos
2012  "Conversations", Dwek Gallery, Jerusalem, Israel. Curated by Irena Gordon
2012  "On the line", Stern Gallery, Tel Aviv, Israel
2012  "Bezeir Anpin", Zadik Gallery, Jaffa, Israel. Curated by Hanna Koman
2011  Group drawings exhibition, Rothschild Gallery, Tel Aviv, Israel
2011  " What's in a landscape? ", Stern Gallery, Tel Aviv, Israel. Curated by Debby Luzia
2011  "Appropriated Place", Zadik Gallery, Jaffa, Israel. Curated by Hanna Koman
2010 "Objects of Desire", Stern Gallery, Tel Aviv, Israel. Curated by Debby Luzia
2009 “Kibbutz”, Gan Shmoel Art Gallery
2005 “Both together and each apart”, Enav Center of Culture, Tel-Aviv, Israel
2005 “Transparencies”, Aykis Gallery, Tel-Aviv, Israel
2005 "House", Raanana, Israel
2002 "Peace", Givat-Hviva Gallery, Israel
1991-3  International Art print exhibition, Barcelona, Spain (catalogue)
1991  International Triennial of art, Krakow, Poland (catalogue)
1990  Painters association in Tel-Aviv, Israel
1986  Jaffa Museum, Jaffa, Israel

See also
Visual arts in Israel

References

External links
Official site

Israeli Jews
Living people
Jewish artists
1960 births
Israeli women artists
Israeli women painters
Israeli contemporary artists
21st-century Israeli women artists
Art educators
Alumni of the Académie de la Grande Chaumière